Alessandra Olivia Toreson (born May 29, 1987), known professionally as Alessandra Torresani and prior to 2007, Alessandra Toreson, is an American actress. She is known for playing Zoe Graystone in the science fiction television series Caprica and Claire in The Big Bang Theory.

Early life
Alessandra Olivia Toreson was born on May 29, 1987, in Palo Alto, California. Her mother was a chief executive officer, while her father ran startup tech companies. She began studying dancing and singing when she was two years old. At the age of 8, she landed a job doing interviews between cartoons on The WB Television Network. She holds a black belt in taekwondo.

She has stated that she is "half-Jewish."

Career
Torresani's television debut was at age nine when she hosted the "Kids' WB Club" for San Francisco's KBWB (Channel 20). She co-starred in the Disney Channel Original Movie Going to the Mat. Her other television credits include guest appearances on Even Stevens, JAG, ER, The War at Home, Malcolm In The Middle, Arrested Development, Terminator: The Sarah Connor Chronicles, and CSI: Crime Scene Investigation among others. In May 2008, Torresani was cast as Zoe Graystone in Syfy's Caprica, a prequel spin-off of Battlestar Galactica, which debuted in 2009.

In 2009, Rolling Stone announced that she was cast to play Lita Ford in The Runaways, a biopic about the all-girl punk band of the same name. Variety later reported that it was Scout Taylor-Compton who would play Ford. In 2010, Torresani was featured as a Girl of Maxim.

In 2013, Torresani starred in the comedy web series Husbands, which first aired on September 13, 2011.

In 2016, she appeared in five episodes of The Big Bang Theory, playing the role of bartender and aspiring screenwriter Claire.

Torresani lives with bipolar disorder and hosts EmotionAL Support with Alessandra Torresani, a mental health podcast.

Filmography

Film

Television

References

External links

1987 births
20th-century American actresses
21st-century American actresses
American child actresses
American film actresses
American television actresses
Actresses from Palo Alto, California
American female taekwondo practitioners
Living people
Jewish American actresses